Siri Rom (March 17, 1918 – November 13, 2002) was a Norwegian actress. She was engaged for many years at the Norwegian Theater.

Theater
Rom debuted at the Falkberget Theater before she was employed at the Trøndelag Theater from 1940 to 1943, at the Oslo New Theater from 1944 to 1945, and from 1946 onward at the Norwegian Theater. On stage, she played roles such as Hedvig in The Wild Duck, Gunvor in Alf Prøysen's Trost i taklampa (1952), Yvonne in Bertolt Brecht's Mother Courage and Her Children (1955), and Nola in William Inge's Come Back, Little Sheba, and she also appeared in Arthur Miller's A View from the Bridge and Finn Carling's Gitrene. In the 1980s, she had roles as Herlofs-Marte in Hans Wiers-Jenssen's Anne Pedersdotter and Hønse-Lovisa in Oskar Braaten's Ungen. She was also engaged in some directing for the theater.

Filmography

1945: Rikard Nordraak as Marie Lund
1951: Kranes konditori as Miss Larsen
1955: Trost i taklampa as Elise
1956: Kvinnens plass as a waitress
1962: Reve-enka as Gurine
1964: Nydelige nelliker as Mrs. Thorvaldsen
1968: De ukjentes marked
1968: Sus og dus på by'n as Mrs. Kreim
1973: Blokk 12, Oppgang C (TV) as Marta
1974: Bør Børson Jr. as Torsøia
1975: Min Marion as Marion's mother
1976: Bør Børson 2 as Torsøia
1979: Lucie as the midwife
1993: Secondløitnanten (The Last Lieutenant) as Rønnaug

References

External links
 
 Siri Rom at Sceneweb
 Siri Rom at Filmfront

1918 births
2002 deaths
20th-century Norwegian actresses
Burials at Vestre gravlund
Actresses from Oslo